Sundarpur Union is a union of Fatikchhari Upazila of Chittagong District.

Geography
Area:

Location
 North: Bhujpur Thana
 East:  Rangamatia Union
 South: Suabil Union
 West:  Harualchari Union

Population
At the 1991 Bangladesh census, Sundarpur Union had a population of 16,949.

References
 Sundarpur Union details, lcgbangladesh.org

Unions of Fatikchhari Upazila